Proton Competition (also known as Team Felbermayr-Proton) is a German auto racing team founded by Gerold Ried. The team is based in Ummendorf, Baden-Württemberg. They currently operate a Porsche 911 RSR sports car in the FIA World Endurance Championship and European Le Mans Series

History

Beginnings and early years 
The team was founded in 1996 by Gerold Ried. Ried entered two GT2-spec Porsche 911 GT2 to compete it in the BPR Global GT Series. Both cars #51 and #69 got six points each in the Teams Championship. 1997 saw Proton compete in the inaugural FIA GT Championship season running one 911 GT2. The team earned only one point throughout the season. Proton also competed at that year's Daytona 24 Hours which saw the team finish 27th overall. Between 1998 and 2002 saw little success for the team. They competed in the same 911 GT2 between these years mostly with the father/son partnership of Gerold and Christian Ried. The team raced the same car in the first few races of the 2003 season before moving down a class from GT to N-GT after purchasing a Porsche 996 GT3-RS They only picked up one point in the season at the final round in Monza.

2004-2006 

Things picked up for the team in 2004 where the team finished fourth in the Teams Championship. Their best race finish was third at the opening round in Monza, the same venue where they scored their only point in the 2003 season. 2005 saw Proton finish second in the Teams Championship, although in a GT2 class that was simply dominated by Gruppe M Racing who won every race in the GT2 class that season. Proton earned 45 points, some 135 points behind Gruppe M. Team Cytosport finished fourth in the LMP1 teams championship.
The team changed its name for the upcoming 2006 season to Team Felbermayr-Proton after Horst Felbermayr Sr. became part of the team. A new colour scheme was also introduced changing from the orange/red and black to a light blue livery, a similar livery to the one used by the team now. It did not bring them as much success as 2005 however, with the team finishing fifth in the Teams Championship. The driver pairing of Christian Ried and Horst Felbermayr Jr. finished eleventh in the Drivers Championship.

2007 

2007 was the year that the team progressed into the Le Mans Series. They competed with three cars in the 2007 season in the GT2 class; No. 77 was a Porsche 997 GT3-RSR driven by Marc Lieb and Xavier Pompidou, No. 79 a 996 GT3-RSR driven by Gerold Ried, Horst Felbermayr Sr. and Philip Collin, and No. 88 a 997 GT3-RSR driven by Christian Ried and Horst Felbermayr, Jr accompanied by a third driver in some races which included Thomas Grüber, Marc Basseng and Johannes Stuck.

The best of these trio of cars was No. 77 which took second place in the Teams Championship only three points behind winners Virgo Motorsport. The driver pairing of Lieb and Pompidou also took second in the Drivers Championship, 9 points behind Rob Bell of Virgo Motorsport and JMB Racing. Car 77 won three of the six races in the season. Car No. 88 only managed to pick up seven points finishing eleventh in the Teams Championship level on points with JMB Racing. Car No. 79 did not pick up any points.

The team also contested selected rounds in the FIA GT Championship that year finishing with only one points scoring race which was eight points at the Bucharest 2 Hours with cars No. 66 and 69 finishing second and seventh respectively.

2007 was also the year that the team made their début at the 24 Hours of Le Mans. The team contested the 75th running of the famous event partnering Seikel Motorsport. The father and son partnership of Horst Felbermayr Jr. and Sr. alongside Philip Collin were the drivers in car No. 71. Qualifying didn't go well with the car qualifying in 52nd position out of 54 cars. The race didn't last long either with the car retiring after 68 laps due to a problem with the electrics.

2008 

Team Felbermayr-Proton's 2008 campaign was similar to 2007's. They would compete every round of the Le Mans Series, selected round in the FIA GT Championship and compete at the Le Mans 24 Hours. The team raced two cars in the LMS rather than three in 2007 with Marc Lieb joined by Alex Davison in car No. 77 while car No. 88 was piloted by the two Horst Felbermayrs and Christian Ried. Despite not winning any races, car 77 finished second in the Teams Championship finishing once again behind Virgo Motorsport with a gap of 5 points this time round. Car 88 finished eighth place with ten points, level with Farnbacher Racing.

The team only competed one round in FIA GT which was the FIA GT Bucharest 2 Hours. The team scored no points in either of the two races that weekend.

The team made its full début at Le Mans with no partnership from Seikel Motorsport this time round. The teams' line up for Le Mans was Horst Felbermayr Sr. Alex Davison and Wolf Henzler. Qualifying went well with car 77 qualifying in second place in the GT2 class behind 2007 class winners IMSA Performance Matmut. They were not able to retain their second place qualifying position during the race but finished a respectable fifth place in class and 27th overall.

2009 

The 2009 season was Felbermayr-Proton's most successful season to date. Marc Lieb remained in car 77 for the 2009 season with Richard Lietz becoming his teammate replacing Alex Davison. Horst Felbermayr Jr. and Christian Ried remained in car 88 with Felbermayr Sr. replaced by Francisco Cruz Martins. It was car 77 that earned all of the success for the team winning three of the five races and winning the Teams Championship by just one point ahead of JMW Motorsport, with car 88 finishing tenth in the standings earning five points. The pair drivers of Lieb and Lietz also won the Drivers Championship beating JMW drivers Rob Bell and Gianmaria Bruni by a point. The team entered the 2009 24 Hours of Le Mans with  essentially two cars with No. 77 driven by LMS regulars Lieb and Lietz, who were joined by Wolf Henzler. They also partnered IMSA Performance Matmut who are long time Porsche competitors with car No. 70 with the two Felbermayrs racing alongside Matmut driver Michel Lecourt. The team were pretty confident going into the race after qualifying where they repeated their 2008 qualifying position of second in the GT2 class. The team narrowly missed out on pole position by only 0.030 seconds behind American Porsche competitors Flying Lizard Motorsports. Unfortunately their race came to a very early end after just 24 laps when car 77 ran out of fuel. The IMSA/Felbermayr car 70 soon followed by retiring on the 102nd lap. Felbermayr-Proton wrapped up their season when they contested the inaugural round of the Asian Le Mans Series and indeed the only round of the season in Asia. The race was at Okayama in Japan and the team brought over the two cars but mixed the driver pairings up a bit. All four drivers were German. Marc Lieb was joined by Le Mans teammate Wolf Henzler in No. 77 and Christian Ried was joined in No. 88 by Marco Holzer. Both cars finished second and fourth in class respectively.

2010 

The team hoped to continue their 2009 success in 2010. The team retained their No. 77 championship winning line up of Lieb and Lietz for the 2010 season with Christian Ried retaining his No. 88 seat alongside Martin Ragginger for the season. Porsche factory drivers Patrick Long and Romain Dumas also joined car 88 for a few of the LMS events. Car 77 once again was the force to be reckoned with winning three of the five races and once again winning the Teams Championship. They finished a comfortable 21 points ahead of second place team AF Corse. Car 88 was a lot more competitive than in previous years finishing fourth in the standings. Lieb and Lietz also retained their Drivers Championship titles beating the AF Corse trio of Jean Alesi, Giancarlo Fisichella and Toni Vilander by 21 points.

2010 was the inaugural season of the Intercontinental Le Mans Cup, a global endurance racing series that mixes in with events like the Le Mans Series and the American Le Mans Series. It is the first of its kind since the World Sportscar Championship last run in 1992. The 2010 edition was a sort of prologue to a proper season with three events with one event in Europe, America and Asia. Felbermayr-Proton took part in the European and Asian rounds at Silverstone and Zhuhai. The team won the championship with 72 points, 15 points ahead of LMS rivals AF Corse. As it was a series for teams and manufacturers, a drivers championship was not awarded.

For the 2010 24 Hours of Le Mans, the team hoped that their championship winning car could prove its status this time round after a disappointing early exit in last years edition. The previous year's car 77 trio of Lieb, Lietz and Henzler remained while car 88 saw the father/son duo of the Felbermayrs return being joined by Slovakian racer Miro Konopka. Qualifying went reasonably well for No. 77 qualifying fourth in class while No. 88 started second last. The race however was a completely different story with car 77 taking the GT2 class victory at Le Mans in 2010 beating Ferrari, Corvette and fellow Porsche factory teams. It was Marc Lieb's second class victory, winning the 2005 24 Hours of Le Mans in the GT2 category with Alex Job Racing. Richard Lietz also won his second class victory in 2010 after winning the GT2 class in his first Le Mans race in 2007 with IMSA Performance Matmut. It was Wolf Henzler's first class victory at Le Mans. Car 88 did reasonably well finishing eighth in a highly competitive GT2 class.

2011 
The 2011 Le Mans Series season saw the GT2 class split to two classes LM GTE Pro and LM GTE Am. GTE Pro was for teams using 2011 spec cars or older and were allowed have a fully professional (gold and platinum) driver line up. GTE Am was for teams with 2010 spec cars or older and could only have one professional or gold category driver in the line up. The team raced with two cars with once in each class. Car 77 was a 2011 spec Porsche 997 GT3-RSR in  LM GTE Pro driven by champions Lieb and Lietz. Car 88 was an older spec GT3-RSR competing in the LM GTE Am class and was driven by Horst Felbermayr Jr. and Christian Ried with appearances from Felbermayr Sr. and Bryce Miller in some of the rounds. In GTE Pro, the team finished third in the Teams Championship, sadly not earning three championships in a row. The GTE Am Porsche also finished third in the championship out of four competitors and picked up a win in the opening round at Paul Ricard.

The team competed in that year's ILMC but only in the GTE Am class and restoring the old Proton Competition name of yesteryear. The car used was No. 63 and had many different driver combinations throughout the seven-round season with Christian Ried racing in all but one of the events. Proton finished third in the championship with 52 points.

The team went into the 2011 24 Hours of Le Mans in two classes as well as being the reigning GT2 Le Mans winners. They kept the Lieb/Lietz/Henzler alliance that won Le Mans in 2010 for their No. 77 GTE Pro car while the GTE Am car No. 63 was driven by team boss Christian Ried and the two Felbermayrs. Proton also operated an extra 911 GT3-RSR No. 88 in the Pro class, driven by Nick Tandy, Abdulaziz al-Faisal and Bryce Miller. The two Pro cars qualified in the middle of the pack while the Am car qualified second fastest in class. Out of the three cars, No. 77 was the only one that finished which was fourth in class. Car No. 63's race came to an end near dawn on the 199th lap when the No. 74 Corvette Racing car in GTE Pro went to lap the Proton Competition car driven by Felbermayr Sr. at the time. Corvette driver Jan Magnussen who was leading in the Pro class at the time, tried to lap the Porsche on the inside of the final part of the Porsche Curves rather than around the outside. The Corvette C6.R went onto the grass and spun hitting the driver's side of the Porsche head on injuring Felbermayr Sr., who was the oldest driver competing at Le Mans in 2011. Car No. 88 retired thirty laps previously.

2012 
Proton Competition announced plans to campaign in the inaugural season of the FIA World Endurance Championship in 2012 with two cars in GTE Pro and GTE Am. Marc Lieb and Richard Lietz would be the regular season pair in the GTE Pro car while Christian Ried and Gianluca Roda were scheduled to compete in the GTE Am Porsche.

2015 
Proton Competition teamed with Dempsey Racing at the 2015 24 Hours of LeMans.

The team qualified 5th and finished 2nd in the LM GTE-AM class with drivers Marco Seefried, Patrick Long, and Patrick Dempsey driving the number 77 Dempsey/Proton Racing Porsche 911 RSR.

External links
Proton Competition official website

German auto racing teams
Auto racing teams established in 1996
1996 establishments in Germany
European Le Mans Series teams
FIA World Endurance Championship teams
24 Hours of Le Mans teams
FIA GT Championship teams
WeatherTech SportsCar Championship teams
Porsche in motorsport